Aisin-Gioro Zhongquan was a Manchu nobleman of the Prince Rui peerage, which was held from 1915 to 1939. His nephew, Yinian, was given the title of Prince Rui, but abandoned and rejected the title, which marked the extinction of the Prince Rui peerage.

The peerage of Prince Rui was created in 1636 in honor of Dorgon's merits. Although Dorgon had no male heir, his nephew Dorbo was adopted by him and succeeded his title. Zhongquan was a descendant of Dorbo.

In 1915, Zhongquan's father Kuibin died around the age of 50-51. This passed the Prince Rui peerage to Zhongquan, who held this title until his death.

References

1892 births
1939 deaths
Aisin Gioro

Qing dynasty imperial princes
Prince Rui (睿)